The Pepperell Hydro Power Plant is a hydroelectric power plant located in Pepperell, Massachusetts on the Nashua River. It also serves as a bridge for Massachusetts Route 113.

History
The power plant was constructed in 1918 by the Pepperell Paper Company as a means to power their nearby paper mill. It was originally constructed with three vertical Francis turbines and a 600 foot long penstock all of which have since been replaced. After the paper company closed in 2002, the Swift River Hydro Operations Company was formed to manage and maintain the dam.

References

Hydroelectric power plants in Massachusetts
Energy infrastructure completed in 1918
Buildings and structures in Middlesex County, Massachusetts